is a Japanese light novel series written by Kenkyo na Circle and illustrated by Meru. It has been published online via the user-generated novel publishing website Shōsetsuka ni Narō since October 2019. It was later acquired by Kodansha, who has released six volumes since July 2020 under their Kodansha Ranobe Bunko imprint. A manga adaptation illustrated by Yōsuke Kokuzawa has been serialized in Kodansha's Magazine Pocket website and app since June 2020, with its chapters collected into ten tankōbon volumes as of February 2023. An anime television series adaptation by Tsumugi Akita Animation Lab has been announced.

Characters

Media

Light novels
Written by Kenkyo na Circle, I Was Reincarnated as the 7th Prince so I Can Take My Time Perfecting My Magical Ability began publication in the user-generated novel publishing website Shōsetsuka ni Narō on October 31, 2019. The series was later acquired by Kodansha, who began publishing the novels with illustrations by Meru on July 2, 2020, under their Kodansha Ranobe Bunko imprint. As of December 2022, six volumes have been released.

Manga
A manga adaptation illustrated by Yōsuke Kokuzawa began serialization in Kodansha's Magazine Pocket website and app on June 27, 2020. As of February 2023, ten tankōbon volumes have been released. In North America, Kodansha USA has licensed the manga for digital English publication. In November 2021, Kodansha USA announced that the series would be released in print in Fall 2022.

Anime
An anime television series adaptation was announced on November 5, 2022. It will be produced by Tsumugi Akita Animation Lab and directed by Jin Tamamura.

Reception
In 2021, the manga adaptation ranked 8th in the seventh Next Manga Awards in the web manga category. As of November 2022, the series had over 2.5 million copies in circulation.

Notes

References

External links
  at Shōsetsuka ni Narō 
  
  
 

2020 Japanese novels
Anime and manga based on light novels
Fantasy anime and manga
Japanese fantasy novels
Japanese webcomics
Kodansha books
Kodansha manga
Kodansha Ranobe Bunko
Light novels
Light novels first published online
Shōnen manga
Shōsetsuka ni Narō
Upcoming anime television series
Webcomics in print